Almon Diblathaimah was one of the places the Israelites stopped at during the Exodus. By the name "Almon Diblathaimah" it is referred to only in Numbers 33:46 and 47, in a list of stopping-points during the Exodus. It is usually considered the same place as Beth-diblathaim of Jeremiah 48:22, mentioned in the oracle against Moab. 

The suffix-he may be read as a locative, for "Almon toward-Diblathaim," in support of which is the Mesha Stele's ". ובת . דבלתן | ובת . בעלמען, and beth-Diblathan and beth-Baal-M'on" and Jeremiah's mention of "Beth-diblathaim . . . and beth-M'on". Baal M'on (Baalmon in some versions) is orthographically identical to the "in Almon" of MT Num. 33:46, and the Peshitta reads Baal M'on in Numbers 33, which suggests the reading "Baalmon toward-Diblathaim". The Talmud agrees that the final he is a locative suffix:For it was taught: Nehemiah says, "Every word which requires a lamed-prefix [i.e. 'toward'], the Bible [sometimes instead] suffixed a he"; and a teaching of the House of Ishmael, "As in the case of Elim-ah, Mahanaim-ah, Mitzraim-ah, Diblathaim-ah . . ."The Septuagint, however, does not transcribe a suffix-he: Γελμὼν Δεβλαθαίμ.

References

Biblical places
Stations of the Exodus